Anthony Dewayne McDaniel (born January 20, 1985) is a former American football defensive tackle. He was signed by the Jacksonville Jaguars as an undrafted free agent in 2006. He played college football at Tennessee. McDaniel has also played for the Miami Dolphins, Tampa Bay Buccaneers,  Seattle Seahawks, New Orleans Saints, and San Francisco 49ers.

College career
McDaniel played college football at the University of Tennessee but was dismissed from the team after assaulting a fellow Tennessee student during a pick up basketball game. He left college as a junior to enter the NFL Draft and was picked up by Jacksonville as an undrafted free-agent.

Professional career

Jacksonville Jaguars

McDaniel played in 11 games as reserve defensive tackle for the Jaguars during the 2006 season. McDaniel finished the year with 21 tackles and one sack. He was inactive for the final five games of the season while battling a hip injury.

Miami Dolphins
On March 19, 2009, McDaniel was traded to the Miami Dolphins for a seventh-round pick in the 2009 NFL Draft.

Seattle Seahawks
On March 28, 2013, McDaniel signed a one-year contract with the Seattle Seahawks. McDaniel and the Seahawks won Super Bowl XLVIII 43–8 over the Denver Broncos in February 2014, and would lose Super Bowl XLIX 28–24 to the New England Patriots the next season. On August 2, 2015, McDaniel was released for salary cap reasons after the Seahawks signed Russell Wilson and Bobby Wagner to long-term extensions that offseason.

Tampa Bay Buccaneers
On August 10, 2015, McDaniel signed a one-year contract with the Tampa Bay Buccaneers.

Seattle Seahawks (second stint)
On August 16, 2016, McDaniel signed with his former team.

New Orleans Saints
On June 16, 2017, McDaniel signed with the New Orleans Saints. He was released on September 2, 2017.

San Francisco 49ers
On October 17, 2017, McDaniel signed with the San Francisco 49ers. On November 13, 2017, McDaniel was released by the 49ers.

New Orleans Saints (second stint)
On December 27, 2017, McDaniel re-signed with the Saints. He was placed on injured reserve on January 10, 2018. He was released by the Saints on February 6, 2018.

Legal troubles

2005
In January 2005, McDaniel assaulted fellow University of Tennessee student, Edward Goodrich, during a pick-up basketball game for which Goodrich received four broken bones and needed a metal plate inserted into his face to repair injuries. McDaniel, originally charged with aggravated assault, a felony, pleaded guilty to misdemeanor assault and agreed to pay restitution to Goodrich for an undisclosed amount. Goodrich had filed an $800,000 lawsuit against McDaniel in Knox County Circuit Court.

2010
On February 6, 2010, McDaniel was arrested on the charge of domestic battery against his girlfriend which allegedly occurred in the driveway of his Broward County Florida residence. He was released on bond the following day.  McDaniel was the first of two defensive lineman for the Miami Dolphins, Phillip Merling being the second, to be arrested and charged with battery against a female during the 2010 offseason.

The charges were later reduced to disorderly contact, a misdemeanor. He pleaded no contest, was sentenced to six months probation, and was required to attend counseling. After pleading no contest, the NFL suspended McDaniel one game, without pay, for violating the league's personal conduct policy.

References

External links
Tennessee Volunteers bio
Seattle Seahawks bio
Miami Dolphins bio

1985 births
Living people
People from Hartsville, South Carolina
Players of American football from Columbia, South Carolina
American football defensive tackles
Tennessee Volunteers football players
Jacksonville Jaguars players
Miami Dolphins players
Seattle Seahawks players
Tampa Bay Buccaneers players
New Orleans Saints players
San Francisco 49ers players
Ed Block Courage Award recipients